Arbelodes albitorquata is a moth in the family Cossidae. It is found in Lesotho and South Africa. The habitat consists of Afromontane grassland-forests and grassland-thicket mosaics.

The length of the forewings is about 12.5 mm. The forewings are buffy olive with a broad white postmedial and terminal band. The hindwings are deep olive-buff.

References

Natural History Museum Lepidoptera generic names catalog

Moths described in 1910
Metarbelinae